The Wairarapa-Bush Rugby Football Union is the body that regulates rugby union in Masterton, New Zealand. It was formed in 1971 with the amalgamation of the Wairapapa and Bush Unions.

The Wairarapa-Bush team play in the Heartland Championship from Memorial Park, Masterton. They were the inaugural winners of the Meads Cup after beating Wanganui 16–14 on 21 October 2006.

Championships 
Wairarapa-Bush won the 2nd division North Island in 1981, 3rd division in 2005 and the Heartland Championship Meads Cup in 2006 and Lochore Cup in 2010.

Heartland Championship placings

Ranfurly Shield 
Wairarapa-Bush have never held the Ranfurly Shield but Wairarapa held the shield in 1927, 1928 and 1950. Wairarapa-Bush were beaten 96–10 by Canterbury in a Ranfurly Shield challenge in July 2006. In July 2015 Wairarapa-Bush challenged Hawke's Bay for the Shield but were defeated 58–7.

Wairarapa-Bush in Super Rugby 
Wairarapa-Bush along with Wellington, Horowhenua-Kapiti, East Coast, Poverty Bay, Hawke's Bay, Manawatu and Wanganui make up the Hurricanes Super Rugby franchise.

All Blacks 
There have been 29 players selected for the All Blacks from the Wairarapa-Bush (From 1971) and when the Union was separated as Wairarapa and Bush Unions.

Wairarapa-Bush (from 1971)
 Brian Lochore 1963,65,66,67,68,69,70,71
 Mike McCool 1979
 Brent Anderson 1986,87
 Marty Berry 1986
 Brett Harvey 1986
 Robbie McLean1987
Zac Guildford.

Pre 1971 {Wairarapa & Bush Unions}
 H.Udy 1882
 A.E.D'Arcy 1893,1894
 R.Gray 1893
 W.McKenzie 1893
 W.D.Watson 1893,1896
 D.H.Udy 1901,1903
 A.L.Armstrong 1903
 A.F.McMinn 1903,1905
 E.Wrigley 1905
 J.G.Donald 1920,21,22,25
 Q.Donald 1923,26,28
 L.H.Harvey 1924,26,28
 A.E.Cooke 1928
 S.Willoughby 1928
 R.T.Cundy 1929
 A.Mahoney 1929,34,35
 K.H.Reid 1929
 W.B.Reside 1929
 J.C.Stringfellow 1929
 W.R.Irvine 1929
 J.J.Mill 1930
 M.B.Couch 1947,49
 A.W.Blake 1949

Clubs 
Wairarapa-Bush Rugby Football Union is made up of 13 clubs, from north to south:
 Puketoi
 Eketahuna
 East Coast
 Pioneer
 Marist
 Masterton Red Star
 Carterton
 Gladstone
 Greytown
 Featherston
 Martinborough
 Tuhirangi

See also 

 Memorial Park, Masterton

References

External links 
 Official site

New Zealand rugby union teams
Rugby clubs established in 1971
New Zealand rugby union governing bodies
Sports organizations established in 1971
1971 establishments in New Zealand